The Capt. Matthew J. Meade House is a historic house located at 309 Division Street in Kaukauna, Wisconsin. It was added to the National Register of Historic Places for its industrial significance on March 29, 1984.

References

Houses completed in 1884
Houses on the National Register of Historic Places in Wisconsin
Houses in Outagamie County, Wisconsin
National Register of Historic Places in Outagamie County, Wisconsin